Log Jammer may refer to:

 Log Jammer (Kennywood), a former log flume ride at Kennywood amusement park
 Log Jammers, a video game